A shogi variant is a game related to or derived from shogi (Japanese chess). Many shogi variants have been developed over the centuries, ranging from some of the largest chess-type games ever played to some of the smallest. A few of these variants are still regularly played, though none are as popular as shogi itself.

The drop rule, often considered the most notable feature of shogi, is absent from most shogi variants, which therefore play more like other forms of chess, with the board becoming less crowded as pieces are exchanged. This is especially true for variants larger than shogi itself − in fact, the largest well-known variant that features the drop rule is the 11×11 game wa shogi.

Predecessors of modern shogi 

Some form of chess had almost certainly reached Japan by the 9th century, if not earlier, but the earliest surviving Japanese description of the rules of chess dates from the early 12th century, during the Heian period. Unfortunately, this description does not give enough information to play the game, but this has not stopped people from trying to reconstruct this early form of shogi, which is usually referred to as Heian shogi (平安将棋). Piece movements were as in modern shogi, but there was no rook or bishop. The board appears to have been either 9x8 or 8x8. The setup is unknown, but can reasonably be assumed to have been the same as in modern shogi (minus the rook and bishop, and minus a gold general in the 8×8 case), but possibly the pawns started on the second rank rather than the third. It can safely be assumed that the game was played without drops, since the weak pieces promote strictly to gold, instead of just moving like gold.

By the 16th century the game had taken a form closer to the modern game: it was played on a 9×9 board with the same setup as in modern shogi except that an extra piece (an elephant) stood in front of the king. This form of the game is known as sho shogi (小将棋), which means "small shogi". (While 9×9 may not seem small, despite the name, it was smaller than the other shogi variants prevalent at the time.) The elephant was eliminated by the Emperor Go-Nara (reign 1526–1557), and it is assumed that the drop rule was introduced at about the same time, giving rise to shogi as we know it today.

Historical variants 

There are a number of shogi variants played on boards larger than 9×9. These variants are all quite old, and were possibly all played without drops. Michael C. Vanier says, "It is thought that the really huge games (dai dai and up) were never really played to any significant extent [...] and were devised merely so that the creators could have the fun of inventing enormous games, amazing their friends and confounding their enemies. However, the games up to tenjiku shogi at least appear to be quite playable, assuming one has the time."

The same 12th-century document which describes the Heian form of shogi also describes a variant played on a 13×13 board, which is now called Heian dai shogi (平安大将棋). As with the smaller Heian shogi, the rules for this game have not been completely preserved.

The most popular large-board variant is chu shogi (中将棋), played on a 12×12 board. The name means medium shogi, and the game is sometimes so called (or called middle shogi) in English. Chu shogi has existed since at least the 14th century; there are earlier references, but it is not clear that they refer to the game as we now know it. Chu shogi is best known for a piece called the lion, which moves like a king but twice per turn. The game was still commonly played in Japan in the early 20th century, but has now largely died out. It has, however, gained some adherents in the West. The main reference work in English is the Middle Shogi Manual by George Hodges.

Other large medieval shogi variants were wa shogi (11×11, sometimes played with drops), dai shogi (大将棋, "great shogi", 15×15), tenjiku shogi (天竺将棋, literally "Indian shogi", but meant "exotic shogi", 16×16), dai dai shogi (大大将棋, "great great shogi", 17×17), maka dai dai shogi (摩訶大大将棋, "ultra great great shogi", 19×19) and tai shogi (泰将棋, "grand shogi", 25×25). These variants date back at least to the 17th century. Tai shogi was thought to be the world's largest chess variant, but recently records of an even larger variant, taikyoku shogi (大局将棋, "ultimate shogi", 36×36), was discovered. However, there is no evidence that any of them were commonly played apart from dai shogi. While a few sets for dai dai shogi, maka dai dai shogi, and tai shogi are known to have been made, they appear to have been intended as display pieces and not for actual playing. Furthermore, the sources for the rules of the larger variants tend to disagree with each other on many particular issues, even including the very moves of the pieces, such that only for chu shogi and dai shogi is it well-known what the historical rules were, and some small lacunae still arise in the latter with rare situations. In the cases of wa shogi and tenjiku shogi, the historical rules can be guessed with some confidence, but they are by no means universally accepted among contemporary players.

Of the historical large-board variants, only wa (11×11), chu (12×12), tenjiku (16×16), and maka dai dai shogi (19×19) have gained a limited following today. There is a society for chu shogi in Japan, as well as some efforts to revive maka dai dai shogi, though both efforts have changed the rules slightly from the historical ones – more significantly for maka dai dai shogi, unlike for chu shogi whose former popularity still lies within living memory. Tenjiku shogi gained some Western following around the turn of the millennium, although not with the historical rules.

Modern variants 
These are some of the new and old shogi variants which have been invented. Time will show which if any of the many recently invented variants stand the test of usage and competition from other games, and stay in use.

Small variants

Standard-size variants

Large variants 

The most recent large board variant is ko shogi (廣将棋 or 廣象棋 "wide shogi", 19×19), which is played on a go board and incorporates elements of Chinese chess. Ko shogi is unusual for the interdependence of its pieces and the complex rules of promotion, but likewise there is no evidence that it was ever played.

Multiplayer variants

One-dimensional variants

Three-dimensional variants

References

External links 
 Shogi variants
 WinBoard Shogi Variants – freeware for playing some Shogi variants on modern PCs by H. G. Muller; some of this software (Shokidoki) has participated in the International Computer Games Association (ICGA) Computer Olympiad, where it has won prizes

 
Games related to chaturanga